The Whirling Ear is a 1958 sculpture by Alexander Calder, installed in Brussels. It was made using sheet metal and paint, with motor.

External links
 

1958 sculptures
Sculptures by Alexander Calder
Sculptures in Belgium